Claude of Lorraine may refer to:
 Claude, Duke of Guise (1496–1550), called "Claude of Lorraine" prior to his creation as Duke of Guise in 1528
 Claude Lorrain: French artist (1600–1682)
 Claude Françoise de Lorraine (1612–1648), French nobleman